William Kwok (born 1972) is a Chinese-American martial artist and promoter of martial arts education. Nicknamed "Kung Fu Gentleman", Kwok founded the Martial Arts Education Society, a non-profit organization which promotes martial arts education and traditional martial arts culture. He also served as the co-chair of Harvard Alumni for Education in New York City.

Martial Arts Background
William Kwok is the elder son of Kwok Yuen-wah, a physical education professor who introduced Wing Chun and movement science to Kwok. Prior to learning Practical Wing Chun from Wan Kam-leung, Kwok trained in various martial arts systems including traditional Taekwondo, under Kim Suk-jun, a disciple of Choi Hong-hi. Kwok is credited with introducing Practical Wing Chun to America. Wing Chun Illustrated writes: "Like the famous monk Xuanzang in the classic Chinese novel Journey to the West, who journeyed to India in quest of the Buddhist scriptures, Kwok helps bring Practical Wing Chun to the America, teaching Westerners how to understand and decode this ancient, yet still modern, Gung Fu style." In 2007, Kwok established Gotham Martial Arts School in New York City. In May 2013, he hosted Wan Kam-leung's first ever American open seminar in New York City. In November 2014, China Central Television produced a documentary, “A Man and Wing Chun”, in which he was featured. In September 2017, he was invited as a guest presenter at the first Wong Shun-leung Ving Tsun North America seminar in Los Angeles, California.

Academic Background
Kwok is acknowledged for analyzing martial arts techniques with modern movement science and improving the teaching methods. Besides learning movement science from his father, he studied physical education at Columbia University. Before promoting martial arts education in America, he taught business studies as an adjunct professor at City University of New York. Kwok also holds a master's degree from Harvard University. He considers the mentorship of his thesis director, historian Philip A. Kuhn, as the "hallmark of his time at Harvard". He is currently pursuing a Doctor of Education degree at Northeastern University, where his goal is to develop a martial arts-inspired social-emotional learning program for elementary school students.

Martial Arts Education Development and Promotion

Kwok is credited as one of the key people who systemized Practical Wing Chun study into a modern-day training program. He promotes the concepts of martial skills and teaching skills as two different skill sets, and that martial arts teachers' training should include teachers education such as curriculum design and analysis, motor learning, and teaching methods. In addition, he emphasizes the need to balance physical training of technique with philosophical training of the mind "like Yin and Yang...complementing and supplementing each other", believing that a strong sense of culture and humility - what he calls "martial virtue" - are critical to the study of martial arts and the improvement of the martial artist.

Kwok founded and acts as president of Martial Arts Education Society in 2018 with the mission of “bringing self-discipline and hope back to our communities." He also developed a program called Martial Mind, a social-emotional learning program for elementary schools.

In March 2018, Kwok was invited as a guest speaker to share his knowledge of martial arts education and Chinese culture in an academic seminar hosted by Harvard Chinese Students and Scholars Association titled "Is Chinese Martial Arts Facing Challenges?" (in Chinese: 中華武術遭遇挑戰？) at Harvard Graduate School of Education.

In October 2018, Kwok presented a seminar he titled "Kung Fu · Life" to students of Princeton University, discussing the philosophy behind martial arts, as well as describing the five sensory systems - the visual, auditory, olfactory, tactile, and proprioceptive systems - which he believes are important in Wing Chun training.

Community Work

Kwok is actively involved in promoting social justice through the practice of martial arts. He has collaborated with several community-based organizations to organize self-defense and safety workshops and zoominars. Kwok's self-defense philosophy highlights the significance of sensory perception and body language as essential skills that empower individuals to take control of their safety. Additionally, Kwok serves as the executive director of two short films, "Kung Fu Grandma" and "Kung Fu Scriptures," which have gained attention for their message of promoting self-defense education and anti-discrimination.

Recognition
 In 2014, Kwok was a recipient of the Honor Award from the Martial Arts History Museum.
 In 2015, Kwok received a Community Leadership Award from the President's Council on Fitness, Sports and Nutrition.
 In 2017, Kwok became the World Ving Tsun Athletic Association's first recipient of the Silver Achievement Award.
 In 2018, he was presented with the Certificate of Merit and a citation of his contribution to promoting Martial Arts and Chinese culture by New York State Assemblyman Peter Abbate. The following year, he received a Certificate of Special Congressional Recognition from US Congressman Max Rose.

References

External links
 Martial Arts Education Society

1972 births
Living people
Harvard University alumni
Wing Chun practitioners from Hong Kong
American Wing Chun practitioners